Charles Lacquehay (4 November 1897 – 3 October 1975) was a French professional cyclist who won the UCI Motor-paced World Championships in 1933 and 1935, finishing second in 1936. During his career that spanned from 1919 to 1938 he took part in 21 six-day races, winning five: in Paris (1926, 1928), Berlin (1926), Breslau (1927) and Nice (1928).

References

1897 births
1975 deaths
French male cyclists
Cyclists from Paris
UCI Track Cycling World Champions (men)
French track cyclists